Dina Ercilia Boluarte Zegarra (; born 31 May 1962) is a Peruvian politician, civil servant, and lawyer currently serving as the President of Peru since 7 December 2022. She had served as the first vice president and minister at the Ministry of Development and Social Inclusion under President Pedro Castillo. Before then, she served as an officer at the National Registry of Identification and Civil Status (RENIEC) from 2007 until 2022. With Boluarte assuming the presidency as the sole vice president, President of Congress José Williams is next in the line of succession.

Boluarte is the first woman to become President of Peru. She was sworn in following President Pedro Castillo's attempt to dissolve Congress, citing the legislature's obstruction of his government, which resulted in his impeachment, ousting, and arrest. Her presidency comes during a period of political turmoil in Peru that began in 2017, as she is the sixth president in five years. She would quickly receive support from right-wing groups and the media organizations in Peru. Boluarte created a coalition with the majority right-wing Congress of Peru, which had lost but not conceded the 2021 Peruvian general election, and the Peruvian Armed Forces, raising concerns about a civilian-military government forming. During her first months as president, protests against her government emerged across Peru, during which authorities perpetrated the Ayacucho massacre and Juliaca massacre. Her government's violent reaction to protests resulted with Freedom House moving Peru from "Free" to "Partly free" in the 2023 Freedom in the World.

Attorney General of Peru Patricia Benavides announced investigations on 10 January 2023 to determine if Boluarte, Prime Minister Alberto Otárola, Minister of the Interior Víctor Rojas, and Minister of Defense Jorge Chávez committed genocide and aggravated homicide. Groups in Congress opposed to Boluarte opened an impeachment motion against her on 25 January 2023, citing moral incapacity. Some Latin American governments, including Argentina, Bolivia, Colombia, Honduras, Mexico and Venezuela have continued to recognize that Pedro Castillo is the democratically elected President of Peru following the events in December 2022 and refused to recognize Boluarte.

Early life and education   
Boluarte was born in Chalhuanca, Apurímac, on 31 May 1962. She graduated as a lawyer from the University of San Martín de Porres and did postgraduate studies at that university.

Early career 
Boluarte is president of the Apurímac Club in Lima. She has worked at National Registry of Identification and Civil Status as an attorney and officer since 2007.

She ran unsuccessfully for mayor of Lima's Surquillo district in 2018, representing the Free Peru party. She also participated in the extraordinary parliamentary elections in 2020 for Free Peru, though she did not obtain a congressional seat.

Vice presidency (2021–2022)

Election 

In the 2021 presidential election she was part of the presidential ticket of Pedro Castillo, which was victorious in the run-off.

During the campaign, Boluarte was widely viewed to position herself more moderately than Castillo, saying that she would not support overriding the Constitutional Court of Peru, but still stated "the wealthy middle class of Lima will surely cease to be a wealthy middle class.” Boluarte also said that if Castillo were to be removed from office, she would resign in support of him. While campaigning in Piura, Diario Correo reported on counter-terrorism police documents that alleged Boluarte was seen working beside members of MOVADEF, an alleged arm of Shining Path.

Conflicts with Free Peru 
On 29 July 2021, she was appointed minister of Development and Social Inclusion in the government of Pedro Castillo.On 23 January 2022, during an interview with La República, Boluarte stated that she never embraced the ideology of Free Peru. The party's general secretary, Vladimir Cerrón, subsequently expelled Boluarte from Free Peru and posted on Twitter, "Always loyal, traitors never." Cerrón also claimed that Boluarte's comment threatened party unity. Party members later requested her expulsion, stating Boluarte "does nothing more than create division and discredit the image" of Cerrón.

On 25 November 2022, she resigned from her position as the minister of Development and Social Inclusion, but remained as first vice president.

On 5 December 2022, after voting 13 in favor and 8 against, a constitutional complaint was filed by the Subcommittee on Constitutional Accusations against Boluarte, alleging that she operated a private club named the Apurímac Club while she was the minister of Development.

Presidency (since 2022)

Inauguration 
On 7 December 2022, during the Peruvian political crisis when Pedro Castillo attempted to dissolve the Congress of the Republic of Peru during impeachment proceedings against him, Boluarte condemned the move as a "breakdown of the constitutional order" and assumed the presidency after the impeachment of Castillo. Boluarte thus became Peru's first female president.

Boluarte's presidency is the most recent instance in Peruvian history where the first vice president succeeded a president who could no longer serve, after First Vice President Martín Vizcarra became president upon the resignation of President Pedro Pablo Kuczynski in 2018. Peru has had seven presidents from 2015 to 2022.

In her first speech to the Congress, she denounced President Castillo and declared her will to form a national unity government to resolve the present political crisis. In the formation of her government, she consulted all the major parties, but selected no members of Congress. Instead she formed what was widely viewed as a technocratic government led by Pedro Angulo Arana, an attorney who faced 13 criminal investigations as of his appointment in December 2022, including abuse of authority, abuse of public administration, abuse of public faith, blackmail, extortion and others.

Observers commented that with growing protests and an undefined support base, Boluarte's government will likely not be given the space, either by Congress or the people, to succeed.

Recognition 

International recognition of Boluarte's government has been mixed.

Members of the São Paulo Forum like Luiz Inácio Lula da Silva of Brazil and Gabriel Boric of Chile recognize Boluarte. The United States has recognized Boluarte as president. Spain was also in support, championing a return to "constitutional order."

Latin American governments, including Argentina, Bolivia, Colombia, Honduras, Mexico and Venezuela have continued to recognize that Pedro Castillo is the democratically elected President of Peru following the events in December 2022 and refused to recognize Boluarte. Left-wing Latin American leaders such as Nicolás Maduro of Venezuela, Andrés Manuel López Obrador of Mexico, Gustavo Petro of Colombia, Alberto Fernández of Argentina, and Luis Arce of Bolivia denounced Boluarte's government as a right wing coup, comparing the situation as similar to ascension of Bolivia's Jeanine Áñez during the 2019 Bolivian political crisis. The latter presidents continue to support Pedro Castillo's claims he is the rightful president under a "government of exception."

2022–2023 Peruvian political protests 

According to CNN, the Boluarte government "has responded to protesters with both stick and carrot; President Boluarte has offered the possibility of holding early elections, while her Defense Minister Luis Alberto Otárola ... declared a state of emergency and deployed troops to the street." The New York Times would describe Bolaurte's response as "hawkish". On 12 December, following protests that broke out after the removal of Pedro Castillo, President Boluarte announced that she and Congress agreed to move the next general election from April 2026 to April 2024. On 14 December, Alberto Otárola, Boluarte's defense minister, declared a state of emergency for 30 days to quell “acts of violence and vandalism.”

Responding to protests, Boluarte said she does not understand why anyone would protest against her and supported the repressive response of authorities. Boluarte's response has been widely condemned by NGOs, while being supported by more right-leaning parties in Congress. Amnesty International's Americas head Erika Guevara-Rosas called for governmental restraint, saying: "State repression against protesters is only deepening the crisis in Peru." Protests have for the most part, been the most fierce and disruptive in Quechua majority regions, the center of Castillo's support. Given the harshness of the Boluarte government's response, this has led some to draw comparison between Boluarte's actions and that of previous anti-Native governments of Peru, which drew comparisons between indigenous groups and the Shining Path, as to persecute them. Bolaurte would also state that the demonstrations occurred due to blackmail and provocations by Bolivian officials, something the Inter-American Commission on Human Rights said they did not observe while The New York Times said that "The government has yet to provide clear evidence to back up ... claims of high-level coordination by a terrorist organization or illicit funding behind the violent attacks."

In a joint statement in January 2023, over 2,000 academics and researchers expressed their "strongest rejection of the authoritarian course that the government of Dina Boluarte and Alberto Otárola" and believed "that these are not isolated events but a pattern of conduct that places us in a dangerous transition to authoritarianism", concluding that "If President Boluarte is only able to offer the country confrontation and violence, she should resign". Notable signers included Steven Levitsky, Lucía Dammert, Martín Tanaka, Daniel Alarcón, Josep Joan Moreso, Gerardo L. Munck, Mirtha Vásquez, Sara Beatriz Guardia and Carmen Mc Evoy.

Ayacucho massacre and cabinet reorganization 

On 15 December 2022, the Peruvian Army in Ayacucho massacred protesters demonstrating against the Boluarte government. During the protests, the situation intensified when the military deployed helicopters to fire at protesters, who later tried to take over the city's airport, which was defended by the Peruvian Army and the National Police of Peru. Troops responded by firing live ammunition at protesters, resulting in ten dead and 61 injured; 90% of the injured had gunshot wounds while those killed were shot in the head or torso. The founder of the Peruvian Forensic Anthropology Team (EPAF), forensic anthropologist Carmen Rosa Cardoza, analysed evidence surrounding those who were killed, saying that the military was shooting to kill and that the gunshot wounds in the head and torso were consistent with wounds suffered during human rights violations, explaining that wounds during an armed conflict are usually found on the extremities. Gloria Cano, attorney for the Association for Human Rights (Aprodeh) who analyzed human rights abuses during the internal conflict in Peru, said officers likely ordered troops to simply "eliminate the enemy" and did not specify actions to take against protesters, with the attorney stating officers "had to explain to them that in case of need they had to shoot into the air, to the ground. If they take them out without giving them specific orders, they will do what they learn, which is to shoot the vital segments of the human body".

Sources close to Boluarte, according to La Republica, reported that she wanted to resign from the presidency following the massacre, though defense minister Alberto Otárola convinced her that if she were to resign, her and other ministers would lose their immunity and possibly be prosecuted for crimes. Otárola then promised to Boluarte that he could build support for her from the Peruvian Armed Forces and right-wing groups according to La Republica. Boluarte would then make Otárola her prime minister on 21 December 2022. In addition to the prime minister, she named a new interior minister, defense minister and education minister. Boluarte's new Minister of Education, Óscar Becerra, was reported to have a history of being a Fujimorist and making homophobic comments.

Juliaca massacre 

At least 18 people were killed and over 100 injured by police responding to protests in Juliaca, with all of the deaths being attributed to gunshot wounds. While discussing the violence, Boluarte said that Bolivia was responsible, stating "Today we know that a type of firearms and ammunition would have entered the country through southern Peru" and that protesters were not shot by authorities, saying the ammunition found in victims was used "neither by the National Police nor by the Armed Forces". According to La República, videos and photographic evidence showed that the PNP used long rifles to fire at demonstrators and individuals nearby. Dany Humpire Molina, former manager of Expertise at the Public Prosecutor's Office and a doctor in forensic science, stated "The projectiles seem to have been fired by AKM rifles, which is weapons used by the National Police, ... If the bullets were found inside the body, they are described as penetrating. When the shots are of a penetrating type, as is the case, they are long-distance. And if the necropsy protocol determines that they went from behind, it means that, at the time of the shooting, the demonstrators were running, fleeing". Edgar Stuardo Ralón Orellana of the Inter-American Commission on Human Rights, stated "we do not find in people something that said that they are responding to some kind of another organization, but an authentic manifestation of a discontent with the abandonment that that region (Puno) has historically had". The former head of the National Directorate of Intelligence (DINI), General Wilson Barrantes Mendoza, also criticized the Boluarte's response, stating that accusations of foreign involvement were "a distraction to confuse the population, noting that it has an external component. Everything we are experiencing is internal" and that the accusation of "a 'terrorist inurgency' is stupid".

Legal action 
On 10 January 2023, Attorney General of Peru Patricia Benavides announced investigations for the alleged crimes of genocide, aggravated homicide and serious injuries against Boluarte, along with Prime Minister Alberto Otárola, Minister of the Interior Víctor Rojas and Minister of Defense Jorge Chávez. Groups in Congress opposed to Boluarte then opened an impeachment motion against her on 25 January 2023, citing moral incapacity.

Political ideology 
During the 2021 Peruvian general election, she was part of Free Peru, a left leaning, marxist and socialist influenced party; after she was expelled from the party in 2022, she adopted more moderate views and appointed conservative figures in her cabinet.

Analysts, according to La Republica, reported that Boluarte's political inexperience has resulted with her shifting from a left-wing ideology in support of rural  constituents towards a right-wing ideology that repressed previous supporters. Americas Quarterly notes that after Boluarte was expelled from the Peru Libre party, she aligned with the right-wing Congress for political support instead of the constituents that elected her, creating a feeling of betrayal for rural and indigenous voters. According to political scientist David Sulmont, Boluarte sought to be expelled from the party because she predicted Castillo would be removed from office and that she could assume the presidency.

Political scientist Daniel Encinas described Boluarte as an "opportunist", noting that though she was elected vice president under a left-wing government, she aligned with right-wing figures in Congress following her accession to the presidency. Sociologist Carlos Reyna, discussing Boluarte's response to protests, stated "A person who manages, covers up and supports the armed and police forces to shoot the bodies of unarmed civilians cannot say that he belongs to a moderate variant, ... Boluarte looks like ... the worst versions of the extreme right". Sulmont would say that Boluarte became a figurehead for Congress, serving the legislative body as a "shield between the population and the right-wing Congress" due to her sacrificing her political legitimacy by resorting to repression.

Public opinion 
In January 2023, the first public opinion poll for Boluarte was collected by the Institute of Peruvian Studies (IEP). In the poll, 71% of respondents disapproved of Bolaurte and 19% approved of her, while 80% of respondents disagree with Boluarte assuming the presidency.

Personal life 
Boluarte can speak Spanish and Quechua. She was married to David Gómez Villasante, with the two having two sons; David Eduardo Gómez Boluarte and Daniel Felwig Gómez Boluarte.

Electoral history

Explanatory notes

References

External links

Biography by CIDOB (in Spanish)

|-

|-

|-

|-

1962 births
Living people
People from Apurímac Region
Presidents of Peru
Vice presidents of Peru
Government ministers of Peru
Free Peru politicians
Independent politicians in Peru
Peruvian women lawyers
Female heads of government
Female heads of state
Women government ministers of Peru
Women presidents
Women vice presidents
University of San Martín de Porres alumni
20th-century Peruvian lawyers
21st-century Peruvian lawyers
21st-century Peruvian women politicians
21st-century Peruvian politicians